The St. George linkage links the North-West Solomonic and New Ireland languages under the Meso-Melanesian languages. Members of the St George linkage are Niwer Mil language, Warwar Feni, Fanamaket, Sursurunga, Konomala, Patpatar, Tolai, Kandas, Ramoaina, Lungalunga, Label, Bilur, and Siar.

References

 
Meso-Melanesian languages